Kanchrapara Harnett High School,  established in 1888,  is one of the oldest higher secondary school located in Kanchrapara, North 24 Parganas, West Bengal, India.

The school follows the course curricula of West Bengal Board of Secondary Education (WBBSE) and West Bengal Council of Higher Secondary Education (WBCHSE) for Standard 10th and 12th Board examinations respectively.

History
The school was started as a primary school in 1888 and secondary section was introduced in 1921 with the name Kanchrapara Harnett School. The school was named after Mr. Harnett, the then officer of Kanchrapara Railway Workshop.

See also
Education in India
List of schools in India
Education in West Bengal

References

External links
 

High schools and secondary schools in West Bengal
Schools in North 24 Parganas district
Educational institutions established in 1888
1888 establishments in India